Adolf Anier (in Tallinn – 27 March 1945) was an Estonian footballer, who played for Estonia.

International career
Anier made his sole appearance for Estonia on 11 August 1922 in a 10–2 loss against Finland.

Personal
Adolf Anier is buried at the Metsakalmistu cemetery in Tallinn.

References

1897 births
1945 deaths
Footballers from Tallinn
People from Kreis Harrien
Estonian footballers
Estonia international footballers
Burials at Metsakalmistu

Association football midfielders